Axel Thayssen (22 February 1885 – 31 January 1952) was a Danish tennis player. He competed in two events at the 1912 Summer Olympics.

References

External links
 

1885 births
1952 deaths
People from Sorø Municipality
Danish male tennis players
Olympic tennis players of Denmark
Tennis players at the 1912 Summer Olympics
Sportspeople from Region Zealand